The Department of Agriculture Development & Farmers' Welfare (Kerala) is one of the Department of Government of Kerala. The Department of Agriculture Development & Farmers' Welfare is a key ministry that manages the agriculture development through promoting scientific methods of cultivation and welfare of  farmers  of State of Kerala through various  policies and programmes. The department is headed by a senior minister who has cabinet ranking as per Indian Cabinet Protocol Laws.

References

Agriculture
Agriculture in Kerala
Kerala